This is a list of notable events in music that took place in the year 1946.

Specific locations
1946 in British music
1946 in Norwegian music

Specific genres
1946 in country music
1946 in jazz

Events 
January 5 – Cincinnati – Policeman Robert C. Wood here became so angry when he discovered that "White Christmas" was not in the juke box selection in a Cincinnati cafe recently, he got out his service revolver and took one shot at the machine. He received a 30-day suspension from Cincinnati Safety Director Hamilton and a bill for $8.50 to pay for repairs to the 'White Christmas-less' juke.
January 6 – A somewhat revised and streamlined revival of Jerome Kern and Oscar Hammerstein II's Show Boat opens on Broadway at the Ziegfeld Theatre, the same theatre at which the original production played back in 1927. This production features newly designed sets and costumes, new, more extended choreography, and a new song, Nobody Else But Me, by Kern and Hammerstein.
February – Kathleen Ferrier's recording contract with Columbia Records expires, and she transfers to Decca.
August – American singer Doris Day leaves Les Brown's band and begins her solo career.
September 11 – The Royal Philharmonic Orchestra holds its first rehearsal.
Formation of Bamberg Symphony and Southwest German Radio Symphony Orchestras.
Al Jolson rerecords his old hits for the soundtrack of his Columbia biopic The Jolson Story (released October 10 in the United States), and becomes a superstar to the post-war generation too.
B. B. King begins working as a professional musician in Memphis, Tennessee.
Chet Atkins makes his first appearance at the Grand Ole Opry.
Georgia Gibbs signs with the Majestic label.
Bill Haley's professional musical career begins as a member of The Down Homers. His earliest known recordings are made during a Down Homers radio performance, but will not be released until 2006.
John Serry Sr. appears as the featured accordion soloist on the Gordon MacRae radio hit Star of Stars.

Albums released 
Annie Get Your Gun – Original Broadway cast
Show Boat – Original Broadway cast
Frank Sinatra Conducts the Music of Alec Wilder – Frank Sinatra
Lombardoland – Guy Lombardo
Louis Jordan And His Tympany Five – Louis Jordan
Manhattan Tower – Gordon Jenkins
The Voice of Frank Sinatra – Frank Sinatra
Merry Christmas Music – Perry Como
What We So Proudly Hail – Bing Crosby
Favorite Hawaiian Songs, Vol. One – Bing Crosby
Favorite Hawaiian Songs, Vol. Two – Bing Crosby
Blue Skies – Bing Crosby
Don't Fence Me In – Bing Crosby and The Andrews Sisters

Top popular records of 1946

For each Year in Music (beginning 1940) and Year in Country Music (beginning 1939), a comprehensive Year End Top Records section can be found at mid-page (popular), and on the Country page. These charts are meant to replace the charts Billboard prints at the end of each year, because they are better.

The charts are compiled from data published by Billboard magazine, using their formulas, with slight modifications. Most important, there are no songs missing or truncated by Billboard's holiday deadline. Each year, records included enter the charts between the prior November and early December. Each week, fifteen points are awarded to the number one record, then nine points for number two, eight points for number three, and so on. This system rewards songs that reach the highest positions, as well as those that had the longest chart runs. This is our adjustment to Mr. Whitburn's formula, which places no. 1 records on top, then no 2 and so on, ordered by weeks at that position. This allows a record with 4 weeks at no. 1 that only lasted 6 weeks to be rated very high. Here, the total points of a song's complete chart run determines its position. Our chart has more songs, more weeks and may look nothing like Billboard's, but it comes from the exact same surveys. 

Before the Hot100 was implemented in 1958, Billboard magazine measured a record's performance with three charts, 'Best-Selling Popular Retail Records', 'Records Most-Played On the Air' or 'Records Most Played By Disk Jockeys' and 'Most-Played Juke Box Records'. As Billboard did starting in the 1940s, the three totals for each song are combined, with that number determining the final year-end rank. For example, 1944's "A Hot Time in the Town of Berlin" by Bing and the Andrews Sisters finished at no. 19, despite six weeks at no. 1 on the 'Most-Played Juke Box Records'(JB) chart. It scored 126 points, to go with its Best-Selling chart (BS) total of 0. Martha Tilton's version of "I'll Walk Alone" peaked at no. 4 on the Juke Box chart, which only totalled 65 points, but her BS total was also 65, for a final total of 130, ranking no. 18. Examples like this can be found in "The Billboard" magazine up to 1958. The 'Records Most-Played On the Air' chart didn't begin until January 1945, which is why we only had two sub-totals.

Our rankings are based on Billboard data, but we also present info on recording and release dates, global sales totals, RIAA and BPI certifications and other awards. Rankings from other genres like 'Hot R&B/Hip-Hop Songs' or 'Most Played Juke Box Race Records', Country charts including 'Most Played Juke Box Folk (Hillbilly) Records', 'Cashbox magazine', and other sources are presented if they exist. We supplement our info with reliable data from the "Discography of American Historical Recordings" website, Joel Whitburn's Pop Memories 1890-1954 and other sources as specified.

The following songs appeared in The Billboard's 'Best Selling Retail Records', 'Records Most-Played On the Air' and 'Most Played Juke Box Records' charts, starting November 1945 and before December 1946.

Top race records

Billboard Most-Played Race Records of 1946 is a year-end list compiled by Billboard magazine, printed in the January 4, 1947, issue. It includes rankings for the calendar year only, handicapping records at the beginning and end of the year such as "Choo Choo Ch'Boogie", which finished second as a result. For all year-end charts on these pages, records that enter the chart in December of the previous year, or remain on the chart after December of the current year, receive points for their full chart runs. Each week, a score of 15 points is assigned for the no. 1 record, 9 points for no. 2, 8 points for no. 3, and so on, and the total of all weeks determined the final rank. Additional information from other sources is reported, but not used for ranking. This includes dates obtained from the Discography of American Historical Recordings website, chart performance from Billboards 'Best Selling Retail Records, Records Most-Played On the Air and Most Played Juke Box Records charts, Most Played Juke Box Folk (Hillbilly) Records, Cashbox, and other sources as noted. Additional information can also be found at List of Most Played Juke Box Race Records number ones of 1946.

Published popular music 
 "Ain't Nobody Here but Us Chickens" words and music: Alex Kramer & Joan Whitney
 "Ain't That Just Like A Woman?" w.m. Fleecie Moore & Claude Demetrius
 "All I Want For Christmas (Is My Two Front Teeth)" w.m. Don Gardner
 "All The Cats Join In" A. Wilder, Ray Gilbert, E. Sauter
"Along With Me" w.m. Harold Rome Introduced by Danny Scholl and Paula Bane in the musical Call Me Mister
 "The 'Ampstead Way" w. Johnny Burke m. Jimmy Van Heusen
 "The Anniversary Song" w.m. Al Jolson & Saul Chaplin
 "Any Place I Hang My Hat Is Home" w. Johnny Mercer m. Harold Arlen
 "Anything You Can Do" w.m. Irving Berlin
 "Aren't You Kind Of Glad We Did?" w. Ira Gershwin m. George Gershwin. Introduced by Dick Haymes and Betty Grable in the 1947 film The Shocking Miss Pilgrim
 "Blue Moon of Kentucky" w.m. Bill Monroe
 "Bumble Boogie" m. Jack Fina
 "Changing My Tune" w. Ira Gershwin m. George Gershwin. Introduced by Betty Grable in the film The Shocking Miss Pilgrim.
 "The Christmas Song" w. Robert Wells m. Mel Tormé
 "Coax Me A Little Bit" w. Charles Tobias m. Nat Simon
 "The Coffee Song" w.m. Bob Hilliard & Dick Miles
 "Come Rain Or Come Shine" w. Johnny Mercer m. Harold Arlen
 "Country Style" w. Johnny Burke m. Jimmy Van Heusen
 "A Couple of Song and Dance Men" w.m. Irving Berlin
 "Do You Know What It Means To Miss New Orleans?" w.m. Eddie DeLange & Louis Alter. Introduced by Billie Holiday & Louis Armstrong in the 1947 film New Orleans.
 "Doin' What Comes Natur'lly" w.m. Irving Berlin
 "Everybody's Got a Laughing Place" w. Ray Gilbert m. Allie Wrubel
"The Face on the Dime" w.m. Harold Rome. Introduced by Lawrence Winters in the musical revue Call Me Mister.
 "Feudin' And Fightin' " w. Al Dubin & Burton Lane m. Burton Lane
 "Five Minutes More" w. Sammy Cahn m. Jule Styne
 "For You, For Me, For Evermore" w. Ira Gershwin m. George Gershwin. Introduced by Dick Haymes in the 1947 film The Shocking Miss Pilgrim
 "A Gal In Calico" w. Leo Robin m. Arthur Schwartz. Introduced by Jack Carson, Sally Sweetland dubbing for Martha Vickers, and Dennis Morgan in the film The Time, the Place and the Girl.
 "The Girl That I Marry" w.m. Irving Berlin. Introduced by Ray Middleton in the musical Annie Get Your Gun and performed by Howard Keel in the 1950 film version.
 "Golden Earrings" w. Jay Livingston & Ray Evans m. Victor Young
 "The House Of Blue Lights" w.m. Don Raye & Freddie Slack
 "How Are Things In Glocca Morra?" w. E. Y. Harburg m. Burton Lane
 "Huggin' And Chalkin' " w.m. Clancy Hayes & Kermit Goell
 "I Got Lost In His Arms" w.m. Irving Berlin. Introduced by Ethel Merman in the musical Annie Get Your Gun.
 "I Got The Sun In The Morning" w.m. Irving Berlin. Introduced by Ethel Merman in the musical Annie Get Your Gun and performed by Betty Hutton in the 1950 film version.
 "I Guess I'll Get The Papers" w.m. Hughie Prince & Hal Kanner
 "If This Isn't Love" w. E. Y. Harburg m. Burton Lane
 "If You Smile at Me" w.m. Cole Porter. Introduced by Victoria Cordova in the musical Around the World
 "I'm A Lonely Little Petunia" w.m. John N. Kamano, William E. Faber & Maurice Merl
 "I'm An Indian Too" w.m. Irving Berlin
 "It's A Good Day" w.m. Peggy Lee & Dave Barbour
 "It's A Pity To Say Goodnight" w.m. Billy Reid
 "Laughing On The Outside" w. Ben Raleigh m. Bernie Wayne
 "Legalise My Name" w. Johnny Mercer m. Harold Arlen
 "Let The Good Times Roll" w.m. Fleecie Moore & Sam Theard
 "Linda" w.m. Jack Lawrence
 "Lost In The Stars" w. Maxwell Anderson m. Kurt Weill
 "Managua, Nicaragua" w. Albert Gamse m. Irving Fields
"Military Life" aka "The Jerk Song" w.m. Harold Rome from the musical revue Call Me Mister
 "Moonshine Lullaby" w.m. Irving Berlin
 "Mr. Jackson from Jacksonville" m.w. Louis Armstrong, Claude Demetrius, Fritz Pollard
 "My Defenses Are Down" w.m. Irving Berlin
 "My Heart Is A Hobo" w. Johnny Burke m. Jimmy Van Heusen
 "My Sugar Is So Refined" w. Sylvia Dee m. Sidney Lippman
 "Old Devil Moon" w. E. Y. Harburg m. Burton Lane
 "The Old Lamp-Lighter" w. Charles Tobias m. Nat Simon
 "The Old Soft Shoe" w. Nancy Hamilton m. Morgan Lewis. Introduced by Ray Bolger in the revue Three to Make Ready.
 "Ole Buttermilk Sky" w.m. Hoagy Carmichael
 "On The Boardwalk In Atlantic City" w. Mack Gordon m. Josef Myrow
 "One-zy Two-zy" w.m. Dave Franklin & Irving Taylor
 "Open The Door, Richard" w. "Dusty" Fletcher & John Mason m. Jack McVea & Dan Howell
 "Put The Blame On Mame" w.m. Allan Roberts & Doris Fisher. Introduced by Anita Ellis dubbing for Rita Hayworth in the film Gilda.
 "A Rainy Night In Rio" w. Leo Robin m. Arthur Schwartz. Introduced by Dennis Morgan, Jack Carson, Janis Paige and Sally Sweetland dubbing for Martha Vickers in the film The Time, the Place and the Girl
 "The Red Ball Express" w.m. Harold Rome. Introduced by Lawrence Winters in the musical revue Call Me Mister.
 "(Get Your Kicks On) Route 66" w.m. Bobby Troup
 "Rumors Are Flying" w.m. Bennie Benjamin & George David Weiss
 "Sooner Or Later" w. Ray Gilbert m. Charles Wolcott
 "South America, Take It Away" w.m. Harold Rome Introduced by Betty Garrett in the musical revue Call Me Mister.
 "Stella by Starlight" w. Ned Washington m. Victor Young
 "Stone Cold Dead in de Market" w.m. Wilmoth Houdini
 "A Sunday Kind of Love" w.m. Barbara Belle, Anita Leonard, Stan Rhodes & Louis Prima
 "Tenderly" w. Jack Lawrence m. Walter Gross
 "That's All Right" w.m. Arthur Crudup
 "There's Good Blues Tonight" Edna Osser, Glenn Osser
 "There's No Business Like Show Business" w.m. Irving Berlin
 "They Say It's Wonderful" w.m. Irving Berlin
 "The Things We Did Last Summer" w. Sammy Cahn m. Jule Styne
 "Time After Time" w. Sammy Cahn m. Jule Styne
 "To Each His Own" w. Ray Evans m. Jay Livingston
 "Uncle Remus Said" w.m. Johnny Lange, Hy Heath & Eliot Daniel
 "Valse" m. Tchaikovsky arr. John Serry, Sr.
 "La vie en rose" w. (Eng) Mack David (Fr) Édith Piaf m. Louiguy
 "When I Walk with You" w. John Latouche m. Duke Ellington. Introduced by Alfred Drake and Jet MacDonald in the musical Beggar's Holiday
 "Who Do You Love, I Hope" w.m. Irving Berlin
 "A Woman's Prerogative" w. Johnny Mercer m. Harold Arlen
 "You Call Everybody Darling" w.m. Sam Martin, Ben Trace & Clem Watts
 "You Can't Get A Man With A Gun" w.m. Irving Berlin
 "You Make Me Feel So Young" w. Mack Gordon m. Josef Myrow
 "Zip-A-Dee-Doo-Dah" w. Ray Gilbert m. Allie Wrubel

Classical music

Premieres

Compositions
Malcolm Arnold – Symphony for Strings, Op. 13
Arno Babajanian – Polyphonic Piano Sonata
Benjamin Britten – Young Person's Guide to the Orchestra
Aaron Copland – Symphony No. 3
George Crumb – Poem; Seven Songs for voice and piano
Gottfried von Einem – Dantons Tod
Don Gillis – Symphony No. 5½, A Symphony for Fun
Ruth Gipps – Symphony No. 2
Jesús Guridi – Sinfonía Pirenaica
Karl Amadeus Hartmann – Symphony No. 2 "Adagio"
Herbert Howells – Gloucester Service
Wojciech Kilar – Mazurka in E minor
Erich Wolfgang Korngold – Cello Concerto
Bohuslav Martinů – Symphony No. 5, H.310; Toccata e Due Canzoni; String Quartet No. 6, H.312
Peter Mennin – Symphony No. 3
Vincent Persichetti – Symphony No. 3
Edmund Rubbra – Cello Sonata, Op. 60
John Serry Sr. –
 Fantasy in F for accordion.
 Valse – music by Tchaikovsky arranged for accordion by Serry
Roger Sessions – Symphony No. 2, Piano Sonata No. 2
Igor Stravinsky – Concerto in D for Strings
Michael Tippett – Little Music for string orchestra
Heitor Villa-Lobos – String Quartet No. 10
William Walton – String Quartet No. 2

Opera 
Benjamin Britten – The Rape of Lucretia – chamber opera opened at Glyndebourne on July 12 with Kathleen Ferrier in the title rôle
Gian Carlo Menotti – The Medium

Film
Bernard Herrmann – Anna and the King of Siam
Erich Korngold – Deception
Erich Korngold – Devotion
Erich Korngold – Of Human Bondage
Max Steiner – The Big Sleep

Jazz

Musical theater 
Annie Get Your Gun (Irving Berlin) – Broadway production opened at the Imperial Theatre on May 16 and ran for 1147 performances
 Around the World ( Music and Lyrics: Cole Porter Book: Orson Welles) Broadway production opened at the Adelphi Theatre on May 31 and ran for 75 performances
 Beggar's Holiday opened at the Broadway Theatre on December 26 and ran for 111 performances
 Burlesque Broadway revival opened at the Belasco Theatre on December 25 and ran for 439 performances
 Call Me Mister Broadway revue opened at the National Theatre on April 18 and ran for 734 performances
 Lute Song ( music: Raymond Scott lyrics Bernie Hanighen) Broadway production opened at the Plymouth Theatre on February 6 and ran for 146 performances
 Show Boat (Jerome Kern and Oscar Hammerstein II) – Broadway revival opened at the Ziegfeld Theatre on January 5 and ran for 418 performances
 Song of Norway London production opened at the Palace Theatre on March 7 and ran for 526 performances
 St. Louis Woman Broadway production opened at the Martin Beck Theatre on March 30 and ran for 113 performances
 Sweetest And Lowest London revue opened at the Ambassadors Theatre on May 9 and ran for 791 performances
Three to Make Ready Broadway revue opened at the Adelphi Theatre (New York) on March 7 and ran for 327 performances.
 Yours Is My Heart Broadway production opened on September 5 at the Shubert Theatre and ran for 36 performances

Musical films 
 The Bamboo Blonde starring Frances Langford
 Breakfast in Hollywood starring Tom Breneman, Bonita Granville, Billie Burke and Zasu Pitts and featuring Andy Russell, The King Cole Trio and Spike Jones and his City Slickers. Directed by Harold D. Schuster.
 Cinderella Jones starring Joan Leslie, Robert Alda, S. Z. Sakall and Edward Everett Horton. Directed by Busby Berkeley.
 Do You Love Me released May 17, starring Maureen O'Hara, Dick Haymes and featuring Harry James and his Music Makers.
 Doll Face starring Vivian Blaine and Dennis O'Keefe and featuring Perry Como and Carmen Miranda. Directed by Lewis Seiler.
 Earl Carroll Sketchbook starring Constance Moore, William Marshall and Edward Everett Horton
 Easy to Wed starring Esther Williams, Van Johnson, Lucille Ball and Keenan Wynn. Directed by Eddie Buzzell.
 Gaiety George released July 22 starring Richard Greene and Ann Todd.
 The Harvey Girls
 Holiday in Mexico starring Jane Powell, José Iturbi, Walter Pidgeon, Roddy McDowall, Ilona Massey and Xavier Cugat. Directed by George Sidney.
 The Jolson Story
 London Town released September 30 starring Sid Fields, Greta Gynt, Petula Clark, Kay Kendall and Sonny Hale and featuring Tessie O'Shea and Beryl Davis.
 No Leave, No Love starring Van Johnson, Pat Kirkwood, Keenan Wynn and Marie Wilson, and featuring Xavier Cugat & his Orchestra and Guy Lombardo and his Orchestra. Directed by Charles Martin.
 Song of the South
 St. Louis Woman
 Susie Steps Out starring David Bruce, Cleatus Caldwell and Margaret Dumont. Directed by Reginald Le Borg.
 Sweetheart of Sigma Chi starring Phil Regan, Elyse Knox and Phil Brito and featuring Frankie Carle & his Orchestra
 Swing Parade of 1946 starring Gale Storm, Phil Regan and The Three Stooges and featuring Connee Boswell and Louis Jordan. Directed by Phil Karlson.
 Tars and Spars starring Janet Blair, Alfred Drake and Sid Caesar.
 Three Little Girls in Blue starring June Haver, George Montgomery, Vivian Blaine, Celeste Holm and Vera Ellen. Directed by Bruce Humberstone.
 Till the Clouds Roll By
 The Time, the Place and the Girl released on December 28 starring Dennis Morgan, Jack Carson, Janis Paige and Martha Vickers.
 Ziegfeld Follies starring Fred Astaire, Lucille Ball, Lucille Bremer, Fanny Brice, Judy Garland, Kathryn Grayson, Lena Horne, Gene Kelly and Red Skelton. Directed by Vincente Minnelli.

Births 
January 1 – Susannah McCorkle, American singer (died 2001)
January 3 – John Paul Jones, born John Baldwin, rock musician (Led Zeppelin)
January 4 – Arthur Conley, soul singer (died 2003)
January 6 – Syd Barrett, born Roger Barrett, rock singer-songwriter (Pink Floyd) (died 2006)
January 7
Andy Brown, drummer (The Fortunes)
Jann Wenner, publisher of Rolling Stone magazine
January 8
Robby Krieger, rock guitarist and singer-songwriter (The Doors)
Elijah Moshinsky, opera director (died 2021)
January 9 – Nihal Nelson, Sri Lnkan singer-songwriter (died 2022)
January 10 – Aynsley Dunbar, drummer (Jefferson Starship) (Journey)
January 11
Naomi Judd, country singer-songwriter (died 2022)
Tony Kaye, English keyboardist (Yes)
January 16 – Katia Ricciarelli, operatic soprano
January 19 – Dolly Parton, country singer-songwriter
January 22 – Malcolm McLaren, impresario, founder of the Sex Pistols (died 2010)
January 26 – Deon Jackson, soul singer (died 2014)
January 27 – Nedra Talley (The Ronettes)
January 28 – Rick Allen (Box Tops)
January 31 – Terry Kath (Chicago) (died 1978)
February 1 – Carol Neblett operatic soprano
February 6 – Kate McGarrigle, folk singer-songwriter (died 2010)
February 7 – Sammy Johns, country singer-songwriter (died 2013)
February 13 – Colin Matthews, composer
February 17 – Dodie Stevens, pop singer
February 20 – J. Geils, rock guitarist (The J. Geils Band) (died 2017)
February 23 – Rusty Young, country rock musician (Poco) (died 2021)
February 24 – Jiří Bělohlávek, conductor (BBC Symphony Orchestra) (died 2017)
March 1 – Tony Ashton, rock musician (Ashton, Gardner and Dyke) (died 2001)
March 6
David Gilmour (Pink Floyd)
Tony Klatka (Blood, Sweat & Tears)
March 7
Peter Wolf (The J. Geils Band)
Matthew Fisher (Procol Harum)
March 8 – Randy Meisner (Poco) (Eagles)
March 12 – Liza Minnelli, singer and actress
March 15 – Howard E. Scott (War)
March 17
Harold Ray Brown (War)
Michael Finnissy, composer and pianist
March 19
Paul Atkinson (The Zombies) (died 2004)
Ruth Pointer (The Pointer Sisters)
March 21 – Ray Dorset (Mungo Jerry)
March 22 – Harry Vanda (The Easybeats)
March 24 – Colin Petersen, drummer (Bee Gees)
March 26 – William Onyeabor, electronic funk musician
March 27 – Andy Bown, (The Herd, Status Quo, Pink Floyd)
March 30 – Dave Ball (The Turtles)
April 1 – Ronnie Lane, singer-songwriter and guitarist (The Faces) (died 1997)
April 3 – Dee Murray (Elton John Band)
April 4 – Dave Hill (Slade)
April 11 – Bob Harris, disc jockey
April 13
Al Green, soul singer
Jim Pons (The Turtles, The Mothers of Invention)
April 15 – Marsha Hunt, actress, singer and novelist
April 16 – Pēteris Vasks, Latvian composer
April 17 – Bill Kreutzmann (Grateful Dead)
April 18
Lenny Baker (Sha Na Na)
Skip Spence (Jefferson Airplane, Moby Grape)
May 1 – Jerry Weiss (Blood, Sweat & Tears)
May 2 – Lesley Gore, singer (died 2015)
May 9 – Clint Holmes, English-American singer-songwriter and game show host
May 10
Donovan, folk singer
Graham Gouldman, singer-songwriter (10cc)
Dave Mason (Traffic)
May 11 – Plume Latraverse, Canadian singer-songwriter and guitarist
May 16 – Robert Fripp, guitarist, composer and record producer
May 20 – Cher, singer and actress
May 24 – Steve Upton, drummer (Wishbone Ash)
May 25 – Siegfried Fietz, song composer
June 1 – Jody Stecher, American singer
June 3 – Eddie Holman, American singer and minister
June 5 – Freddie Stone (Sly and the Family Stone)
June 10 – Millie Small, singer (died 2020)
June 11 – John Lawton (Uriah Heep) (died 2021)
June 15
Noddy Holder, English vocalist (Slade)
Demis Roussos, Greek singer (died 2015)
June 18 – Maria Bethânia, Brazilian singer (sister of Caetano Veloso)
June 25
Ian McDonald, musician and record producer (King Crimson, Foreigner)
Allen Lanier (Blue Öyster Cult) (died 2013)
June 30
Billy Brown (The Moments)
Iain Matthews, singer-songwriter
July 8 – Stella Chiweshe, Zimbabwean mbira player (died 2023)
July 9 – Bon Scott (AC/DC) (died 1980)
July 15 – Linda Ronstadt, singer
July 19 – Alan Gorrie (Average White Band)
July 21 – Barry Whitwam (Herman's Hermits)
July 22
Mireille Mathieu, singer
Stephen M. Wolownik, American musicologist (died 2000)
July 23 – Andy Mackay, saxophonist, oboist and composer
July 24 – Alan Whitehead (Marmalade)
July 28
 Jonathan Edwards, folk musician and songwriter
 Suzanne Stephens, clarinetist and basset-hornist
July 30 – Jeffrey Hammond-Hammond (Jethro Tull)
July 31
Gary Lewis (Gary Lewis & The Playboys)
Bob Welch (Fleetwood Mac) (died 2012)
August 1
Boz Burrell, English singer-songwriter and guitarist (King Crimson) (Bad Company) (died 2006)
Rick Coonce, American drummer (The Grass Roots) (died 2011)
August 10 – Peter Karrie, star of West End musical productions
August 14 – Larry Graham (Sly and the Family Stone)
August 15 – Jimmy Webb, songwriter
August 19 – Beat Raaflaub, conductor
August 23 – Keith Moon, drummer (The Who) (died 1978)
September 1
Gregg Errico (Sly and the Family Stone)
Barry Gibb, singer-songwriter (Bee Gees)
September 4
Gary Duncan (Quicksilver Messenger Service) (died 2019)
Greg Elmore (Quicksilver Messenger Service)
September 5
Dean Ford, singer (Marmalade) (died 2018)
Freddie Mercury, lead singer (Queen) (died 1991)
Loudon Wainwright III, singer-songwriter, humorist and actor
September 9
Doug Ingle (Iron Butterfly)
Bruce Palmer (Buffalo Springfield) (died 2004)
Billy Preston, singer and musician (died 2006)
September 14 – Pete Agnew (Nazareth)
September 18 – Alan "Bam" King (Ace)
September 19 – John Coghlan, drummer (Status Quo)
September 20 – Finbarr Dwyer, accordionist and fiddler (died 2014)
September 24 – Jerry Donahue (Fairport Convention)
September 28 – Helen Shapiro, pop singer
September 30 – Sylvia Peterson, pop singer (The Chiffons)
October 10
John Prine, country folk singer-songwriter (died 2020)
Willard White, opera singer
October 11 – Gary Mallaber, drummer (Steve Miller Band)
October 13 – Dorothy Moore, R&B singer
October 14
Justin Hayward, guitarist and singer-songwriter (The Moody Blues)
Dan McCafferty (Nazareth) (died 2022)
October 15 – Richard Carpenter (The Carpenters)
October 18 – Howard Shore, film composer
October 19 – Keith Reid (Procol Harum)
October 21 – Lee Loughnane (Chicago)
October 22 – Eddie Brigati (Young Rascals)
October 24 – Jerry Edmonton (Steppenwolf)
October 26 – Keith Hopwood (Herman's Hermits)
October 29 – Peter Green, blues rock guitarist and singer-songwriter (Fleetwood Mac) (died 2020)
October 30
René Jacobs, conductor and countertenor singer
Chris Slade (AC/DC)
November 1 – Ric Grech, vocalist & multi-instrumentalist (Blind Faith) (Family), bassist (Traffic) (died 1990)
November 5
Herman Brood, Dutch rock 'n' roll artist (died 2001)
Gram Parsons, country musician (died 1973)
November 8 – Roy Wood, singer-songwriter and multi-instrumentalist (The Move, Electric Light Orchestra, Wizzard)
November 11 – Chip Hawkes, vocalist and guitarist (The Tremeloes)
November 17 – Martin Barre, guitarist (Jethro Tull)
November 19 – Joe Correro Jr., drummer (Paul Revere and The Raiders)
November 20 – Duane Allman, lead & slide guitarist (The Allman Brothers Band) (died 1971)
November 22 – Aston Barrett, reggae musician
November 29 – Eamonn Campbell, guitarist & mandolin player (The Dubliners)
December 1 – Gilbert O'Sullivan, singer-songwriter
December 5
José Carreras, opera singer
Andy Kim, singer
December 6 – Emílio Santiago (died 2013)
December 10
Gloria Loring, American singer and actress
Walter Orange (The Commodores)
December 12 – Clive Bunker (Jethro Tull)
December 14 – Jane Birkin, UK actress and singer
December 15 – Carmine Appice (Vanilla Fudge, Cactus)
December 16
Benny Andersson, singer-songwriter (ABBA)
Trevor Pinnock, conductor and harpsichordist
December 21
Christopher Keene, American conductor (died 1995)
Kevin Peek, Australian guitarist and songwriter (died 2013)
Carl Wilson (The Beach Boys) (died 1998)
December 23 – Edita Gruberová, opera singer
December 24 – Jan Akkerman, guitarist (Focus)
December 25 – Jimmy Buffett, singer-songwriter, author, businessman and film producer
December 27 – Lenny Kaye (Patti Smith Group)
December 28 – Edgar Winter, multi-instrumentalist and singer
December 29 – Marianne Faithfull, singer and actress
December 30 – Patti Smith, poet and singer-songwriter

Deaths 
January 7 – Adamo Didur, operatic bass, 77
January 10 – Harry Von Tilzer, songwriter, 73
January 18 – Lew Pollack, US composer, 50
February 2 – Eduard Bass, singer and cabaret director, 58
February 15 – Putney Dandridge, jazz musician, 44
February 20 – Hugh Allen, organist and choral conductor, 76
April 5 – Vincent Youmans, US composer, 47
May 25 – Patty Hill, co-writer of "Happy Birthday to You", 78
June 1 – Leo Slezak, operatic tenor, 72
July 14 – Riley Puckett, country musician, 52 (blood poisoning)
July 20 – Tricky Sam Nanton, trombonist, 42
August 8 – Maria Barrientos, coloratura soprano, 63
August 24 – Antonio Paoli, operatic tenor, 75
August 31 – Paul von Klenau, Danish composer and conductor, 63
September 3 – Moriz Rosenthal, pianist, 83
September 4 – Paul Lincke, composer, 79
September 15 –  classical composer, 25
September 16 – Mamie Smith, vaudeville singer, dancer, pianist and actress, 63
October 9 – Enrica Clay Dillon, American opera singer, opera director, and voice teacher, 65
October 12 – Giuseppe Adami, opera librettist, 67
October 16 – Sir Granville Bantock, composer, 78
November 5 – Zygmunt Stojowski, composer and pianist, 76
November 14 – Manuel de Falla, composer, 69
November 30 – Albert Gumble, ragtime composer, 63
December 6 – Maximilian Steinberg, composer and teacher, 63
December 28 – Carrie Jacobs-Bond, US songwriter, 84
December 30 – Charles Wakefield Cadman, composer, 65

Date unknown

 Teddy Brown, xylophone player (born 1900)
 Armanda Degli Abbati, Italian opera singer (born 1879)
 George De Cairos Rego (died mid June) Music Professor and Composer
 Albert Bokhare Saunders

References

 
20th century in music
Music by year